Lachen railway station is a railway station in the Swiss canton of Schwyz and municipality of Lachen. The station is located on the Lake Zurich left-bank railway line, owned by the Swiss Federal Railways (SBB).

Layout and connections 
Lachen has a  island platform with two tracks ( 2–3). PostAuto Schweiz operates bus services from the station to Ziegelbrücke, Siebnen, and Pfäffikon.

Services 
 the following services stop at Lachen:

 Zürich S-Bahn:

References

External links
 
 

Lachen
Lachen